Naima Salhi is an Algerian politician.

Salhi is president of the Equity and Proclamation Party (PEP). She was elected to the People's National Assembly in the 2017 legislative elections.

References

Living people
Algerian politicians
Members of the People's National Assembly
Year of birth missing (living people)